Green Island (in ) is a rocky island near the mouth of Fortune Bay, Newfoundland.

Sovereignty
In Article XIII of the Treaty of Utrecht (1713), France acknowledged British ownership of and sovereignty over Newfoundland and its adjacent islands, of which Green Island is one.

The Saint Pierre and Miquelon islands later on were ceded back to France by the 1763 Treaty of Paris and the British and French signatories of the 1783 Treaty of Versailles made it clear that the mid channel line between Newfoundland and Saint Pierre and Miquelon was to be the boundary line.

Although the territorial location of the island remained legally unclear for a long time because it is nearer to Saint Pierre island than to Newfoundland but at the same time nearer to Newfoundland than to Little Miquelon, it eventually was assumed to be part of Newfoundland after the British lighthouse had been built on it (1908). The 1972 agreement between Canada and France determining the line constituting the limit of the territorial waters of Canada and of the zones submitted to the fishery jurisdiction of France finally confirmed its location on the Canadian side of the boundary line.

The maritime boundary is demarked by

Green Island Lighthouse
The first lighthouse was built on Green Island in 1908. It was replaced in 1955 with an aluminium skeletal tower, and this was replaced with the present structure in 1993. The foghorn sounds every 60 seconds as well.

See also
 Canada–France Maritime Boundary Case
 List of lighthouses in Canada
 List of lighthouses in Newfoundland and Labrador

References

Gallery

External links
 Aids to Navigation Canadian Coast Guard
 Lighthouse website, complete with picture
 Another lighthouse website
 Picture of Green Island Lighthouse

Islands of Newfoundland and Labrador
Lighthouses in Newfoundland and Labrador
Canada–Saint Pierre and Miquelon border